Adriana Livia Opriș (born 17 September 1996), known professionally as Olivia Addams, is a Romanian singer, songwriter, and member of the band Jealous Friend. She gained the greatest popularity in 2020 after releasing the single "Dumb".

Early life and career

1996–2017: Childhood years. The first musical activities
Adriana Livia Opriș was born in Bucharest, Romania, in a family where her mother is a lawyer and her father is an accountant. At the age of three, she started singing in the Allegretto Children Choir from Bucharest. For the next fourteen years, she travelled the world with the children's choir and performed in many countries, including Japan, the United States, China, Singapore, Mexico, and all over Europe.
Olivia studied for a year in Germany because she wanted to learn German and then returned to Romania and continued her faculty and master's degree also in German.

2018-2021
In 2018 Olivia Addams appeared in Pete Kingsman's single "Love Poison". In 2019 the singer recorded her first solo single, called "Sick Lullaby". The song was widely broadcast in the Commonwealth of Independent States and became a hit in Ukraine. In the same year, she joined the Jealous Friend band, with whom in 2019 she recorded three songs: "Who's Gonna Love You" (with Jesse Zagata), "In My Mind", and "Cold".

Olivia Addams' first single in 2020 was "I'm Lost" and was followed by "Dumb". It got to the Polish music charts in the 9th position. In August 2020, it released the single "Fish in the Sea". In the same year, she recorded three songs with the Jealous Friend band: "Wanna Say Hi" (with Bastian), "Himalayas" (with Tobi Ibitoye) and "To The Moon And Back". In November 2020, she released a single "Are We There?" through which the awareness-raising efforts and the fight against bullying continue. In December 2020, she released a Christmas single entitled "Merry Tik Tok" with Romanian dacer Emil Rengle.

On April 16, 2021, Olivia Addams released the single "Stranger" through Global Records and Creator Records.
 The single performed well in the Commonwealth of Independent States. Also, in April 2021, she released the single "Believe" with the Jealous Friend band.

In May 2021, Addams was invited to Poland. During this trip, she gave an interview to Paulina Krupińska and Damian Michałowski in the program Dzień Dobry TVN and was invited to Radio Eska, Radio Zet and 4fun.tv. She also sang in a duet with Sanah in her song "Invisible Dress".

On June 24, 2021, she released together with the Romanian band Akcent the single "Heart Attack". The music and lyrics of the song were created by Achim Marian, Adrian Sînă, Andreas Öberg, George Papagheorghe and Olivia Addams.

Starting in 2021, she is a juror together with Speak and Marius Moga at Hit Play, the first music show made by Vodafone and broadcast exclusively on the Internet, and which aims to find the next music star in Romania.

Discography

Singles 
 As lead artist

 Promotional singles

Songs for other artists

Music videos

References

External links 

 

1996 births
YouTube vloggers
TikTokers
Ultra Records artists
Romanian singer-songwriters
Romanian women pop singers
Romanian electronic musicians
Musicians from Bucharest
Living people
Global Records artists
21st-century Romanian singers
21st-century Romanian musicians
Romanian songwriters